Derrick Graham Downing (born 3 November 1945) is an English former professional footballer who played as a defender or a winger in the Football League for Middlesbrough, Orient, York City and Hartlepool United and in non-League football for Frickley Colliery, Scarborough, Mexborough Town Athletic, Hatfield Main and Sutton United. He also served as player-manager at Hatfield Main. He attended the Percy Jackson Grammar School, Doncaster, 1957–1964.

References

1945 births
Living people
Footballers from Doncaster
English footballers
Association football defenders
Association football wingers
Frickley Athletic F.C. players
Middlesbrough F.C. players
Leyton Orient F.C. players
York City F.C. players
Hartlepool United F.C. players
Scarborough F.C. players
Mexborough Town F.C. players
Hatfield Main F.C. players
English Football League players
English football managers
Hatfield Main F.C. managers